Hollywood/Northeast 42nd Avenue Transit Center, also known as Hollywood Transit Center, is a light rail station in the MAX Light Rail system and is located in the Hollywood District of Portland, Oregon. It is the 11th stop eastbound on the eastside MAX main line. It is served by the Blue, Green and Red Lines, of TriMet.  It is also a transit center (bus station for local buses), served by three TriMet bus routes.

The transit center is located south of the intersection of Northeast 42nd Avenue and Halsey Street.  The MAX station platform is situated between Interstate 84 and a Union Pacific Railroad line and is connected by stairs and an elevator to a pedestrian bridge which connects to the transit center bus bays to the north and neighborhoods to the south, across the freeway.  The platform is separated from the freeway only by the eastbound tracks and a low crash wall, causing the platform level of this station to be somewhat noisy most hours of the day.

The station was located in TriMet fare zone 2 from its opening in 1986 until September 2012, at which time TriMet discontinued all use of zones in its fare structure.

Bus service
This transit center is served by the following bus lines:
66 – Marquam Hill/Hollywood  (stop ID number 10871)
75 – Cesar Chavez/Lombard  (stop ID numbers 10868 and 10872)
77 – Broadway/Halsey  (stop ID numbers 10869 and 10870)
Note: Line 12-Barbur/Sandy Blvd stops nearby on Sandy Blvd. Previously, from Hollywood Transit Center's opening in 1986 until 2001, line 12 served it directly.

Stabbing incident

On May 26, 2017, the station was the site of a stabbing in which two people died by having their throats slashed. According to reports, Jeremy Joseph Christian was verbally abusing two women who he believed were Muslim. Three bystanders attempted to stop the abuse and Christian stabbed two of them to death. Christian was arrested at the station and was later sentenced to two consecutive life terms for the attack.

See also
 List of TriMet transit centers

References

External links

Hollywood/NE 42nd Ave. Transit Center – TriMet page
MAX station information (with westbound ID number) from TriMet
MAX station information (with eastbound ID number) from TriMet

1986 establishments in Oregon
Hollywood, Portland, Oregon
MAX Blue Line
MAX Green Line
MAX Red Line
MAX Light Rail stations
Railway stations in the United States opened in 1986
TriMet transit centers
Death in Oregon
Railway stations in Portland, Oregon
Bus stations in Portland, Oregon